Athletics Alberta is the provincial sports organization responsible for the promotion, coordination and organization of track and field, cross-country and road running in Alberta, Canada. Athletics Alberta is the provincial governing body that represents the national sport governing body, Athletics Canada.

Athletics Alberta is a registered non-profit organization that has been established to help coordinate a program of worthwhile believes in facilitating the message of a healthy active lifestyle through participation and development of excellence in Athletics. Athletics Alberta provides governance of the sport of athletics for members through fair play and equal opportunity for male and female athletes, officials and coaches.

Over the past 42 years, Athletics Alberta has served as a communications medium for all groups involved in athletics within the province. The opportunity for athletes, teachers, coaches, officials, administrators and volunteers to exchange information and for the members to experience the sport of athletics (provincially and nationally) to engage in friendly athletic competitions is a valuable life and educational experience for all participants.

See also
 Sports in Canada
 Athletics Canada
 Other Provincial Organizations Governing Athletics

References

External links
Official Website

Sports governing bodies in Alberta
Sport in Alberta
Athletics (track and field) in Canada